Prison on Fire II is a 1991 Hong Kong action film directed by Ringo Lam, and starring Chow Yun-fat. The film is a sequel to 1987's Prison on Fire.

Plot
Like the first film, this follows the fraternal bond of two inmates, once again Ching, but this time with "Brother Dragon", a boss of the "Black Rats" gang. Ching escapes the prison in order to see his son, Leung was placed in an orphanage after his grandmother died, and gets into trouble with "Scarface's replacement, Officer Zau. Ching escapes a second time to follow Boss Dragon after he lied about jumping off a cliff to escape. Ching looked for his son and intended to bring him along, but was refused by the social worker.

He was later apprehended by the police and was brought back to prison. On the way, Officer Zau tortures Ching. Ching gets thrown into the prison cell of the Mainland group and is beaten up by them as they thought he was the one who betrayed Brother Dragon. Skull takes a toothbrush, with a sharpened back and stabs Ching. Ching then convinces Brother Fireball and the other cellmates to set a fire in the prison cell, so as to escape from prison.

After the fire breaks out, all the prisoners assembles outside, but Ching yells for help and runs towards to the Hongkie group for help. A fight then occurs between the Hongkie group and the Mainlanders, resulting in the arrival of more police personnel, who use water jet sprayers to control the situation, while Skull goes into hiding inside the canteen. Ching follows Skull and a violent fight starts. Officer Zau and his officers witness the fight and instead of breaking it up, Zau gives the order to lock them up, watching them fighting behind the gate. Skull begs Officer Zau to open the gate but Zau refuses.

Skull self reproaches on his mistakes to Ching, and when Ching turns his back, Skull tries to stab Ching with the toothbrush again. Ching eventually knocks Skull down by dragging him over the table. Officer Zau then opens up the gate, and tries to use his baton to hit Ching, but was stopped by a good officer. Unfortunately, the good officer gets knocked down by Zau's barbaric act. Ching picks up the toothbrush and hides it while Officer Zau approaches him. Zau hits Ching's left arm and Ching uses the toothbrush, and stabs it into Officer Zau's left eye. Officer Zau screams in pain and engages in delirium. Officer Zau collapses on the floor and Ching faints. Ching awakes in a hospital and takes up his son's report card and reads it.

His cellmate commented that his son's "handwriting was not bad", also a message for his dad: "Dad, don't be naughty in prison, Don't let me worry about you, remember..." this sentence is meaningful, "Tolerate, Tolerate, Tolerate...." Ching was discharged from the hospital and was being brought back to his cell, an officer told him that he was lucky that he had an officer to stand witness for him about the fight, that officer also gained a higher position thanks to him, signaling an end to the chaos.

A new superintendent visits the cell and it is a coincidence that they met together back at the orphanage when he escaped the prison for the first time. Ching requests the superintendent, when he visits the orphanage, to look out for his son. Before the ending credits roll, an officer says "Long time no see" to Ching, and it's Officer "Scarface" from the previous film, Ching then self mutters ... about how unlucky he is. However the tone of the scene is built to be humorous implying Scarface no longer wields any similar threat, especially since the prisoners from the mainland were instructed not to hurt Ching, while he maintains an elder appreciation and respect from his Hongkonger cellmates.

Cast
 Chow Yun-fat as Chung Tin-ching
 Chen Sung-young as Dragon
 Yu Li as Miss Wong
 Tommy Wong as Bill
 Victor Hon as Chiu-chow Man
 Elvis Tsui as Officer Zau
 Wan Yeung-ming as Fai Chi
 Frankie Ng as Blind Snake
 Roy Cheung as Officer "Scarface" Hung (cameo)

See also
Chow Yun-fat filmography
List of Hong Kong films

External links

Hong Kong New Wave films
1991 films
1991 action thriller films
1990s prison films
Hong Kong action thriller films
Hong Kong prison films
Hong Kong sequel films
Triad films
1990s Cantonese-language films
Films directed by Ringo Lam
Films about prison escapes
Films set in Hong Kong
Films shot in Hong Kong
1990s Hong Kong films